What the Day Owes the Night is a 2008 novel by Algerian writer Yasmina Khadra. It was originally written and published in French. The English translation was produced by Frank Wynne, and published by Heinemann in 2010.

Film adaptation
The 2012 film What the Day Owes the Night is based on the novel.

Awards
 Lire magazine - Best book of the year (2008)

References

2010 novels
Algerian novels
Algerian novels adapted into films
French-language novels